Rezső Bálint (14 October 1885 – 18 November 1945, in Budapest) was a Hungarian painter known for his landscape paintings.

He began as a printer and later he studied painting under the guidance of Manó Vesztróczy and Ferenc Szablya-Frischauf. In 1906 he continued his studies of painting in Nagybánya (Baia Mare, Romania) and later in Paris. He had his first exhibition in Budapest in 1909. In 1910 and 1911 he rented a studio jointly with A. Modigliani on Montparnasse in Paris.

In 1911 and 1912 he worked with an extensive number of artists at Kecskemét. In 1919 he published a portfolio entitled Shapes, Patches and Lines presenting ten stone-drawings preceded by an introduction by the Hungarian poet, Dezső Kosztolányi.

After 1920 he lived in Izbég a municipality of Szentendre where he mostly painted landscapes. The Hungarian National Gallery today contains three of his pictures: "Mother with Her Child", "Interieur", "A Hospital Scene".

External links and sources
Fine Arts in Hungary

1885 births
1945 deaths
Artists from Budapest
20th-century Hungarian painters
20th-century Hungarian male artists
Hungarian male painters